Subhajit Saha is a professional table tennis player from West Bengal, India. He won the men's doubles gold at the 19th Commonwealth Games' table tennis championship held at New Delhi in 2010.

Early life
Saha is a Bengali and hails from Siliguri in West Bengal.

Delhi Commonwealth Games
At the 2010 Commonwealth Games in New Delhi, he won the gold medal in the men's doubles event with Sharath Kamal.

References

1980s births
Living people
Bengali sportspeople
Indian male table tennis players
Racket sportspeople from West Bengal
Commonwealth Games gold medallists for India
Table tennis players at the 2010 Commonwealth Games
People from Siliguri
Table tennis players at the 2010 Asian Games
Table tennis players at the 2006 Asian Games
Table tennis players at the 2002 Asian Games
Commonwealth Games medallists in table tennis
Asian Games competitors for India
Recipients of the Arjuna Award
Medallists at the 2010 Commonwealth Games